Richard Cole (born 15 July 1983) is a former Australian rules footballer for the Collingwood and Essendon Football Clubs in the Australian Football League.

Cole was a half-back flanker and was drafted by Collingwood in the first round of 2001 AFL Draft. 2004 was the best season in his AFL career, in which he finished sixth in Collingwood's best and fairest. He played a total of 56 games for the Magpies.

Essendon acquired Cole via trade at the end of the 2005 season. He made a total of 7 AFL appearances for the Bombers and was delisted at the end of the 2007 season. He is now a part of the Buffaloes football club (NT)

External links

1983 births
Living people
Collingwood Football Club players
Essendon Football Club players
Darwin Football Club players
Indigenous Australian players of Australian rules football
Australian rules footballers from the Northern Territory
Eastern Ranges players
Cobram Football Club players
Williamstown Football Club players
Bendigo Football Club players
Bundoora Football Club players